Tuskegee is the tenth and most recent studio album by American singer Lionel Richie. It was released by Mercury Records on March 5, 2012 in the United States. The album consists entirely of reinterpretations of previously released songs by Richie, each performed with a different guest artist, all of which are stars in the country music genre. Tuskegee is named after the Alabama city where Richie was born and later completed his undergraduate degree at Tuskegee Institute.

The album became Richie's third number-one album on the Billboard 200 and his first since Dancing on the Ceiling in 1986. Tuskegee also became Richie's first album to sell more than a million copies in the United States since Dancing on the Ceiling.

Critical reception

At Metacritic, which assigns a normalized rating out of 100 to reviews from mainstream critics, Tuskegee has an average score of 74 based on 8 reviews, indicating "generally favorable reviews." Boston Globe critic Sarah Rodman called Tuskegee an "enjoyably sunny new album," writing that "while it would be easy to dismiss this as calculated – which it is – Richie and his guests are having such a good time and the songs themselves are so irresistible it’s easy (like a Sunday morning) to get caught up in the spirit." Nate Chinen called Tuskegee a "sleek, sure-footed new country duets album." He wrote that "Richie sounds terrific: easeful and soulful, if no longer exactly youthful. The characteristic smoothness of his delivery makes him both an approachable partner and a malleable backup singer."

Mikael Wood from  Entertainment Weekly felt that "it's still gratifying to see how many A-list Nashville stars lined up for guest spots on Tuskegee—Sheldon! Tim! Shania! Willie!—and to hear how naturally the Alabama native countrifies R&B classics like 'Endless Love' and the Jennifer Nettles-assisted 'Hello'." Rolling Stone critic Rob Tannenbaum remarked that "these collaborations jell because Richie's style is so expansive, musically and emotionally." BBC Music critic Lloyd Bradley noted that whether "the album is enough to please hard core country fans is not really the point here – Richie’s post-Commodores output was largely ignored by soul fans. He's a pop artist of substance, and as such brings a touch of class and sufficient flavour of another genre to the mainstream to make music that’s interesting and lasting."

Los Angeles Times journalist Randy Lewis felt that while "Richie still never really steps away from the polished sheen that characterized his musical heyday, [his] recordings were always among the fluffier hits of the time, anyway, never seriously challenging Prince or Michael Jackson among R&B-rooted pop innovators, and now he's not giving Hank, Merle or Johnny anything to fret about either." Allmusic editor Stephen Thomas Erlewine found that "even if the production has changed – it's not as glossy as the '80s, there are fewer keyboards and more guitars – the sensibility remains the same, so Tuskegee generates a bit of déjà vu: the surroundings are new, yet everything feels familiar. Whether that’s a comfortable bit of nostalgia or just a shade too predictable depends entirely on the tastes of the listener."

Promotion
"Endless Love" featuring singer Shania Twain was released as the album's lead single in the United States on February 7, 2012. In Denmark, "Say You, Say Me" featuring Rasmus Seebach was released as the first single on February 22, 2012. Four promotion singles — "Easy" featuring Willie Nelson, "Just for You" featuring Billy Currington, "Stuck on You" featuring Darius Rucker, and "Hello" featuring Jennifer Nettles — were released in advance of the album.

Although it was not released as a single, "Deep River Woman" featuring Little Big Town, charted on the Billboard Hot Country Songs chart from unsolicited airplay and reached a peak of number 60. It was also the only song from the album to make an appearance on the chart, though the album's lead single, "Endless Love," was a Top 20 hit on the Adult Contemporary chart.

Commercial performance 
An unexpected hit, Tuskegee debuted in the United States at number two on the Billboard 200 behind Madonna's MDNA (2012). It sold 199,000 copies in its first week, becoming Lionel Richie's best sales week since Nielsen SoundScan began tracking sales data in 1991. The following week the album sold 95,000 copies and fell two places to number four. In its third week on the chart Tuskegee rose to number one, selling 129,000 copies, while making Tuskegee Richie's third number-one album as well as his first since Dancing on the Ceiling (1986). Tuskegee was certified platinum by the Recording Industry Association of America (RIAA) on May 3, 2012, for shipments of one million units in the US. As of December 2012, it has sold 1,071,000 copies.

In the United Kingdom, the album debuted at number seven on the UK Albums Chart with first-week sales of 19,320 copies. It is Lionel Richie's eleventh top 10 album there. In Canada, the album debuted at number one on the Canadian Albums Chart, selling 18,000 copies.

Track listing

North American edition

British edition 

The deluxe edition includes a bonus DVD featuring the making of the record, artist interviews and behind the scenes footage.

Dutch edition

Personnel
Performers and musicians

 Tom Bukovac – guitar (tracks 1 to 4, 8, 10 to 14)
 Buddy Cannon – backing vocals (track 5)
 Chris Carmichael – strings, string arrangement (track 2)
 Perry Coleman – backing vocals (tracks 1 to 4, 8, 11 to 14)
 Chad Cromwell – drums (tracks 1 to 4, 7 to 9, 11 to 14)
 Dan Dugmore – steel guitar (tracks 1 to 4, 8, 11 to 14)
 Paul Franklin – steel guitar (tracks 1 to 4, 8, 10 to 14)
 Kenny Greenberg – guitar (tracks 1 to 4, 8, 11 to 14)
 Robert Greenidge – steel drums (tracks 1 to 4, 8, 11 to 14)
 Doyle Grisham – steel guitar (tracks 1 to 4, 8, 11 to 14)
 Tina Gullickson – backing vocals (tracks 1 to 4, 8, 11 to 14)
 Roger Guth – drums (tracks 1 to 4, 8, 11 to 14)
 Kim Keyes – backing vocals (tracks 1 to 4, 8, 11 to 14)
 John Jarvis – keyboards (tracks 1 to 4, 8, 11 to 14)
 John Lovell – trumpet (tracks 1 to 4, 8, 11 to 14)
 Mac McAnally – guitar (tracks 1 to 4, 8, 11 to 14), backing vocals (tracks 1 to 4, 8, 11 to 14)
 Ralph MacDonald – percussion (tracks 1 to 4, 8, 11 to 14)
 Jim Mayer – bass (tracks 1 to 4, 8, 11 to 14), backing vocals (tracks 1 to 4, 8, 11 to 14)
 Peter Mayer – guitar (tracks 1 to 4, 8, 11 to 14), backing vocals (tracks 1 to 4, 8, 11 to 14)
 Gordon Mote – keyboards (tracks 1 to 4, 8, 11 to 14)
 Steve Nathan – keyboards (tracks 1 to 4, 8, 11 to 14)
 Willie Nelson – guitar (tracks 1 to 4, 8, 11 to 14)
 Mickey Raphael – harmonica (tracks 1 to 4, 8, 11 to 14)
 Michael Rhodes – bass (tracks 1 to 4, 8, 11 to 14)
 Lionel Richie – vocals, keyboards (tracks 1 to 4, 8, 11 to 14)
 Chris Rodriguez – backing vocals (tracks 1 to 4, 8, 11 to 14)
 Nadirah Shakoor – backing vocals (tracks 1 to 4, 8, 11 to 14)
 Jimmie Lee Sloas – bass (tracks 1 to 4, 6, 8, 10 to 14)
 Ilya Toshinsky – guitar (tracks 1 to 4, 8, 11 to 14)
 Michael Utley – keyboards (tracks 1 to 4, 8, 11 to 14)
 John Willis – acoustic guitar (track 5)

Charts

Weekly charts

Year-end charts

Decade-end charts

Certifications

Release history

References

2012 albums
Lionel Richie albums
Albums produced by Tony Brown (record producer)
Albums produced by Dann Huff
Mercury Records albums
Vocal duet albums
Country albums by American artists